The Northern Alliance, officially the Northern Alliance (Burma) (abbreviated NA-B), is a military coalition in Myanmar composed of four ethnic insurgent groups: the Arakan Army (AA), the Kachin Independence Army (KIA), the Myanmar National Democratic Alliance Army (MNDAA) and the Ta'ang National Liberation Army (TNLA). Since December 2016, the Northern Alliance has been in fierce military confrontations with the Tatmadaw (Myanmar Armed Forces) in the towns of Muse, Mong Ko, Pang Hseng, Namhkam and Kutkai in Shan State. The Northern Alliance members are also part of the Federal Political Negotiation and Consultative Committee (FPNCC).

References

External links 
Northern Alliance

Paramilitary organisations based in Myanmar
Rebel groups in Myanmar
Separatism in Myanmar
2016 establishments in Myanmar